Brothers is a 1982 Australian drama television film directed by Terry Bourke. It includes a re-enactment of the 1975 murder of the Balibo Five in East Timor.

Production
The script was based on a novel Reflex by Australian actor and writer Roger Ward. It was about a photojournalist in Vietnam inspired by Sean Flynn. Ward almost got up a film based on the novel in the early 70s with Jack Thompson in the lead but it did not happen. Ward spent the next few years trying to set up the film elsewhere and eventually sold it to Terry Bourke, who rewrote Ward's script extensively.

The movie was shot in the Philippines, Taihape and Narrabeen.

Cast
Chard Hayward as Adam Wild
Ivar Kants as Kevin Wild
Margaret Laurence as Lani Aveson
Jennifer Cluff as Alison Lewis
Alyson Best as Jenine Williams
Joan Bruce as Mrs Williams
Les Foxcroft as Jim Williams
James Elliott as Rev. Maynard

Release
The film was not released in Australian cinemas but was screened on television. Roger Ward is trying to get funding for a new version of his novel.

References

External links

1982 films
Films based on Australian novels
Films set in East Timor
Films shot in Sydney
Films shot in the Philippines
1980s English-language films
Australian drama television films
Films directed by Terry Bourke
1980s Australian films